Jeff Gillette is a contemporary American artist based in Southern California. He is best known for his subversive 'slumscape' paintings ironically featuring Disney characters. He is often cited as the inspiration for Banksy's 2015 Dismaland theme park installation, in which he was a featured artist.

Influences 

Gillette grew up in the suburbs outside Detroit and drew a lot of creative inspiration from "The Wonderful World of Disney" TV show. When he visited the actual Disneyland theme park in 1978, he found himself disappointed by its artificiality, staying for only 30 minutes. As an artist, however, Disney characters, especially Mickey Mouse, continued to hold his interest.

Gillette dropped out of college in 1982 and began touring the most "beautiful and horrid landscapes" he could find, which included the Himalayas and Calcutta, India. He later became a volunteer for Peace Corps. Many of the 'slumscapes' he paints are directly inspired by the residential slums he witnessed in his extensive travels. 

After moving to Orange County for a teaching position (where Disneyland is based), he became inspired to combine the two distinct aesthetics of residential wastelands and theme parks in his work. 

Gillette is a self-described pessimist, influenced by the writings of German philosopher Arthur Schopenhauer. He describes his work as "taking the things people love and imposing the worst-case scenario [on them]"

Exhibitions 
Gillette has been exhibiting his work since 1997, with his first solo show at Broadway Gallery in Santa Ana, CA.

The style he is currently known for emerged in a solo show called "Slumscapes - Blasphemy Blowout," which depicted American fast food restaurants such as McDonald's against backdrops of slums and well-known cartoon figures juxtaposed with religious iconography.

His 2010 solo show at Copro Gallery in Santa Monica, "Dismayland," was a commercial success and drew interest in his work from British artist Banksy. The aesthetic and themes established here began to define him as an artist. 

In 2015, Banksy contacted Gillette through his manager to purchase a “Minnie Hiroshima” painting (that became the official poster available at the Dismaland gift shop). Afterwards, he invited Gillette to be in a group exhibition in England at what was then described as “an abandoned theme park” in Weston-super-Mare, Dismaland. His pieces sold very quickly at the show. Gillette then began to show in London at the former Lawrence Alkin Gallery,now the Rhodes Gallery, and internationally elsewhere.

In 2017, he mounted a solo show at Gregorio Escalante Gallery in Los Angeles called "Total Dismay," that turned the exhibition space into an "art landfill." In the show, he premiered a series of new paintings mounted on walls and priced thousands of dollars, while the floor was littered with paper prints that patrons would actually walk on top of, that were for sale for $5.

Dismaland 
In Spring 2015, Gillette was messaged on Facebook by Banksy's manager and invited to participate in a secretive group exhibition called Dismaland, a temporary art project organized by Banksy and built in the resort town of Weston-super-Mare, three hours outside of London. The pop-up would be a fully functioning theme park designed as "a sinister twist on Disneyland." It opened on August 21, 2015 and ran until September 27. Banksy described it as a "family theme park unsuitable for children."

Including Gillette, the show featured 58 artists, such as Bill Barminski, Damien Hirst, Jenny Holzer, Peter Kennard, and Ben Long. Gillette premiered six new paintings on canvas for the pop-up as part of his "Dismayland" series. Banksy created ten new works and funded the construction of the exhibition himself. Approximately 4,000 tickets were available for sale per day, priced at £3 each.

References

External links 
 Jeff Gillette on Artsy

1979 births
Living people
American graffiti artists